In the mathematical study of stochastic processes, a Harris chain is a Markov chain where the chain returns to a particular part of the state space an unbounded number of times. Harris chains are regenerative processes and are named after Theodore Harris. The theory of Harris chains and Harris recurrence is useful for treating Markov chains on general (possibly uncountably infinite) state spaces.

Definition

Let  be a Markov chain on a general state space  with stochastic kernel . The chain  is a Harris chain if there exists , and probability measure  with  such that 
 If , then  for all .

The first part of the definition ensures that the chain returns to some state within  with probability 1, regardless of where it starts. It follows that it visits state  infinitely often (with probability 1). The second part implies that once the Markov chain is in state , its next-state can be generated with the help of an independent Bernoulli coin flip. To see this, first note that the parameter  must be between 0 and 1 (this can be shown by applying the second part of the definition to the set ). To choose the next state , independently flip a biased coin with success probability . If the coin flip is successful, choose the next state  according to the probability measure . Else (and if ), choose the next state  according to the measure  (defined for all measurable subsets ).

Using the same coin flip to decide the next-state of both processes, it follows that the next states are the same with probability at least .

Examples

Example 1: Countable state space 

Let Ω be a countable state space. The kernel K is defined by the one-step conditional transition probabilities P[Xn+1 = y | Xn = x] for x,y ∈ Ω.  The measure ρ is a probability mass function on the states, so that ρ(x) ≥ 0 for all x ∈ Ω, and the sum of the ρ(x) probabilities is equal to one.  Suppose the above definition is satisfied for 
a given set A ⊆ Ω and a given parameter ε > 0.   Then P[Xn+1 = c | Xn = x] ≥ ερ(c) for all x ∈ A and all c ∈ Ω.

Example 2: Chains with continuous densities 

Let {Xn}, Xn ∈ Rd be a Markov chain with a kernel that is absolutely continuous with respect to Lebesgue measure:

 K(x, dy) = K(x, y) dy

such that K(x, y) is a continuous function.

Pick (x0, y0) such that K(x0, y0 ) > 0, and let A and Ω be open sets containing x0 and y0 respectively that are sufficiently small so that K(x, y) ≥ ε > 0 on A ×  Ω. Letting ρ(C) = |Ω ∩ C|/|Ω| where |Ω| is the Lebesgue measure of Ω, we have that (2) in the above definition holds.  If (1) holds, then {Xn} is a Harris chain.

Reducibility and periodicity

In the following ; i.e.  is the first time after time 0 that the process enters region . Let  denote the initial distribution of the Markov chain, i.e. . 

Definition:  A recurrent Harris chain  is aperiodic if , such that , 

Theorem: Let  be an aperiodic recurrent Harris chain with stationary distribution .

References

Markov processes